Dasarna Kingdom was one of the many kingdoms ruled by Yadava kings in ancient central and western India. It lay to the south of the Chedi and Panchala kingdoms, in northern Madhya Pradesh. The Panchala prince Sikhandi married a princess from Dasarna. Sikhandin was alleged to be 'one of the neuter-gender'. This led to a dispute between the Dasarna king and the Panchala king Drupada.

There was another Dasarna Kingdom in the western regions along with the Sivis, Trigartas, Western-Malavas and Amvasthas. (2,31), in the Punjab province of Pakistan.

References in Mahabharata

Dasarna, a kingdom in Bharata Varsha 

Dasarna is listed in the list of kingdoms of Bharata Varsha (ancient India).

The Kuru-Panchalas, the Salwas, the Madreyas, the Jangalas, the Surasena, the Kalingas, the Vodhas, the Malas, the Matsyas, the Sauvalyas, the Kuntalas, the Kasi-kosalas, the Chedis, the Karushas, the Bhojas, the Sindhus, the Pulindakas, the Uttamas, the Dasarnas, the Mekalas, the Utkalas; the Panchalas, the Kausijas ... (6,9)

Chedi was one among the kingdoms chosen for spending the 13th year of exile by the Pandavas.

Surrounding the kingdom of the Kurus, are, many countries beautiful and abounding in corn, such as Panchala, Chedi, Matsya, Surasena, Pattachchara, Dasarna, Navarashtra, Malla, Salva, Yugandhara, Saurashtra, Avanti, and the spacious Kuntirashtra. (4,1)

Pandava's travel from Dwaita forest to Matsya Kingdom 

Leaving Dwaita woods Pandavas moved (eastwards) towards river Yamuna, passing through many hills and forests. Terminating their forest life they proceeded (southwards) to the southern bank of Yamuna. By killing the deer of the forest, they passed through Yakrilloma and Surasena, (they turned westwards), leaving behind them, on their right the country of the Panchalas and to their left the Dasarnas. Finally they entered the Matsya territory, leaving the forest. The city of Virata was still far away.

The passage below, describes the locations of various ancient kingdoms. This gives a vague idea that Dasarna lied west to Panchala Kingdom

Dasarna King Sudaman 

Dasarna king Sudaman had two daughters. One was married to Chedi king Viravahu (Suvahu). The other one was married to Vidarbha king Bhima. The famous princess Damayanti was the daughter of this Vidarbha king Bhima. (3,69)

Dasarna King Sudharman defeated by Pandava Bhima 

Pandava Bhima, during his military campaigns for collecting tribute for Pandava king Yudhishthira's Rajasuya sacrifice, reached Dasarna Kingdom

Bhima then subjugated the Dasarnas. There in the country of the Dasarnas, the king called Sudharman with his bare arms fought a fierce battle with Bhimasena. And Bhimasena, beholding that feat of the illustrious king, appointed the mighty Sudharman as the first in command of his forces. (2,28)

Western Dasarnas defeated by Pandava Nakula 

Pandava Nakula, during his military campaigns for collecting tribute for Pandava king Yudhishthira's Rajasuya sacrifice, reached the western Dasarna Kingdom

In the western region, Nakula subjugated the Dasarnas, the Sivis, the Trigartas, the Amvashtas, the Malavas, the five tribes of the Karnatas, and those twice born classes that were called the Madhyamakeyas and Vattadhanas. (2,31)

Dasarna king Hiranyavarman 

King Hiranyavarman  possessed a large army. He had a beautiful daughter. Panchala king Drupada chose this Dasarna princess as the wife of their son Sikhandi, who was born as a female, but brought up as a man. When the secret was out regarding the true sex of Sikhandi, a war broke between Dasarnas and Panchalas. Hiranyavarman ordered his army to sack Kampilya (Kampil in Uttar Pradesh), the capital city of Panchalas.(5-192,193). King Drupada’s city was naturally well-protected. Yet at the advent of danger, O monarch, they began to protect it all the more carefully and fortify it with defensive works. (5,194)

Sikhandi, wished to die, and went to the forest of a Yaksha named Sthunakarna, who will kill any intruder into that forest. Within the forest stood his mansion with high walls and a gateway, plastered over with powdered earth, and rich with smoke bearing the fragrance of fried paddy. Entering that mansion, Sikhandi fasted for many days, to die. The Yaksha, out of kindness, converted Sikhandi into a male. He returned to his kingdom and ended the dispute between the Dasarnas and Pachalas. (5-194,195)

King Hiranyavarman was mentioned as the brother of Drupada :- Drupada's words:- My powerful brother, king Hiranyavarman, having mustered a large force, is coming towards me in anger.(5,193)

Dasarnas in Kurukshetra War

On Pandava side 

Dasarna king took part in the Kurukshetra War on the side of Pandavas. (the ruler of the Dasarnas, the Prayagas, with the Daserakas, and the Anupakas, and the Kiratas) (6,50)
The rulers of the Chedis, and Vasudana, and the king of the Dasarnas followed Bhima.(6,96)
The ruler of the Dasarnas rushed against the king of the Pragjyotisha(7,24)

On Kaurava side 

Dasarna army is mentioned as following the Kaurava general Drona along with other armies (viz the Kuntalas, the Magadhas, the Vidarbhas, the Melakas, the Karnas, and the Pravaranas) (6,51)

Dasarna King Chitrangada defeated by Pandava Arjuna 

Arjuna reached Dasarna during his military campaign after the Kurukshetra War.

After conquering the Kasis, the Angas, the Kosalas, the Kiratas, and the Tanganas, Arjuna reached the country of the Dasarnas. The ruler of that people was Chitrangada.
Between him and Arjuna occurred a battle exceedingly terrible. Bringing him under his sway  Arjuna proceeded to the dominions of the Nishada king, viz., the son of Ekalavya. (14,83)

Krishna 

Words of Vasudeva Krishna to Karna:- Dasarhas and the Dasarnas, will be numbered with thy relatives (if he joined the Pandavas.) (5,140)

See also 
Kingdoms of Ancient India

Other kingdoms in this group include:
Heheya (Narmada valley)
Surasena (Mathura district Uttar Pradesh)
Chedi (Jhansi, Uttar Pradesh)
Karusha (in Madhya Pradesh)
Kunti (in Madhya Pradesh)
Avanti (around Ujjain)
Malava (Eastern Rajasthan) (migrated from Western Malava)
Gurjara (Southern Rajasthan)
Anarta (Northern Gujarat)
Saurashtra (Southern Gujarat)
Dwaraka (Offshore Gujarat)
Vidarbha (North East Maharashtra)

References 

Mahabharata of Krishna Dwaipayana Vyasa, translated to English by Kisari Mohan Ganguli

External links

Empires and kingdoms of India
Yadava kingdoms